Setanta Hurling Club is a Gaelic Athletic Association club located near Killygordon, County Donegal, Ireland. The club is solely concerned with the game of hurling.

It currently competes in the Donegal SHC.

History
Setanta won its first Donegal SHC title in 1973. Since then, it has won a total of 17 club titles, including a six-in-a-row between 1983 and 1988.

Notable players

 Kevin Campbell — Nicky Rackard Cup winner
 Declan Coulter — selected as an All Star replacement, scored 1–6 in a game in Dubai and named man of the match
 Danny Cullen — captained Ireland in the Shinty–Hurling International Series
 Donal Reid — one of the winners from the 1992 All-Ireland Senior Football Championship Final, he also played hurling for Setanta

Honours
Donegal Senior Hurling Championship (17): 1973, 1974, 1980, 1981, 1983, 1984, 1985, 1986, 1987, 1988, 1990, 2007, 2008, 2017, 2019, 2020, 2022
Ulster Junior Club Hurling Championship (1): 2017, 2022

References

Gaelic games clubs in County Donegal
Hurling clubs in County Donegal